Cryphiomima is a genus of moths of the family Noctuidae.

Species
 Cryphiomima obliqua Berio, 1976/77

References
Natural History Museum Lepidoptera genus database

Noctuidae